Brighton Beach is a community on Coney Island, in the borough of Brooklyn, New York City.

Brighton, Brighton Beach, or Brighton Beachside may also refer to the following places:

Place names

Beaches
 Brighton Beach (South Georgia), a beach in South Georgia and the South Sandwich Islands
 Brighton Beach, a popular local beach in Brighton, South Australia
 New Brighton State Beach, colloquially known as "Brighton Beach", in Santa Cruz, California
 Dendy Street Beach, in Brighton, Victoria, a beach-side suburb of Melbourne, Australia

Settlements
Brighton, a seaside resort in East Sussex, England (the original Brighton Beach)
Brighton Beach, a neighbourhood of Windsor, Ontario
Brighton-Le-Sands, New South Wales, a beach-side suburb of Sydney, Australia
Brighton Beach, a community in Duluth, Minnesota
Brighton Beach, an unincorporated area in Georgina, Ontario
Brighton Beach, a community in the District of North Vancouver, British Columbia
Brighton Beach, a developer name for the suburb of Jindalee, Western Australia
Brighton Beach, a community in Long Beach Township, New Jersey
Brighton Beach, a local government in Perth, Australia, gazetted locality by the City of Stirling in the suburb of Scarborough
Brighton Beachside, a developer name for the suburb of Butler, Western Australia

Transportation
Brighton Beach (BMT Brighton Line), the subway station ( trains) serving Brighton Beach, Brooklyn, New York City
Brighton Beach railway station in the Melbourne, Australia suburb of Brighton

See also
 Brighton Beach Memoirs, a play by Neil Simon
 Brighton Beach Memoirs (film), the adaptation of the play
 Brighton hotel bombing
 Brighton (disambiguation)